East of Java is a 1935 American drama film directed by George Melford and starring Charles Bickford, Elizabeth Young and Frank Albertson.

Cast
 Charles Bickford as Red McGovern aka Harvey Bowers 
 Elizabeth Young as Ann Martin  
 Frank Albertson as Larry Page  
 Leslie Fenton as Captain Wong Bo  
 Sig Ruman as Hans Muller  
 Clarence Muse as First Mate Johnson  
 Jay Gilbuena as Lee  
 Frazer Acosta as Lute  
 Charles McNaughton as 'Sloppy Alf' 
 Edgar Norton as Resident

References

Bibliography
 Goble, Alan. The Complete Index to Literary Sources in Film. Walter de Gruyter, 1999.

External links

1935 films
American drama films
1935 drama films
1930s English-language films
Films directed by George Melford
Universal Pictures films
American black-and-white films
Films set on islands
Films about survivors of seafaring accidents or incidents
Films about lions
Films about tigers
1930s American films